The state highways in North Dakota are the state highways owned and maintained by the North Dakota Department of Transportation (NDDOT). North Dakota is a state located in the Midwestern region of the United States, along the Canadian border. The state is bordered by Manitoba and Saskatchewan to the north, Minnesota to the east, South Dakota to the south, and Montana to the west.


Signage

Until 2016 North Dakota highway signage had an "N" and a "D" in the top corners and a Native American profile, based on Lakota policeman Marcellus Red Tomahawk; since 2016 the marker has had "North Dakota" on a black background, the state in outline, and the highway number within the state outline. This transition to new signs is a slow process that will take years before the old signs are completely out of commission. The state will be replacing the old signs as needed, so both versions can currently be seen while driving on North Dakota roads. 

According to NDDOT, this change was made for a number of reasons. These include the department's centennial celebration, to demonstrate the significant spending to improve North Dakota roads in the past few years, and to keep uniformity across the United States. According to an NDDOT representative, "a number of different states use their state outline or symbol on the highway signs." However, many states use geometric shapes or silhouettes of state symbols for their highway markers, which leads some North Dakota residents to believe NDDOT's decision to change the marker design was done to satisfy the political correctness movement.

Mainline highways

Special routes

See also

Burkle addressing system - The system used to assign road names to smaller, rural roads in North Dakota.

References

External links
NDDOT's Highway Systems Page
North Dakota Highways Page by Chris Geelhart

State